The Chairman of the National Assembly of Suriname is the presiding officer of the National Assembly of Suriname.

List of chairmen
The following is a complete list of office-holders since independence in 1975:

Political parties

Timeline

See also
 List of chairmen of the Estates of Suriname

Notes

References

Suriname
Chair